Jang Won-Seok (born April 16, 1986) is a South Korean football player who plays for K League 2 side Daejeon Citizen.

External links
 

1986 births
Living people
Association football defenders
South Korean footballers
Incheon United FC players
Jeju United FC players
Daejeon Hana Citizen FC players
K League 1 players
K League 2 players
K3 League players